Abdulrahman El Bahnasawy is a mentally ill Canadian citizen who was convicted of terrorism-related offenses in 2016. El Bahnasawy plotted to carry out, via online chatting, an attack on Times Square in New York City and to also attack the subway system. In December 2018, El Bahnasawy was sentenced to 40 years in federal prison under intensive solitary confinement despite his serious mental illness.

Early life 
El Bahnasawy was born in Kuwait. Throughout El Bahnsawy's adolescent life, he struggled with issues related to his mental illness and subsequent substance abuse.
Abdulrahman has a significant history of mental health difficulties prior to his arrest. Since the age of 14 years old, Abdulrahman was placed as an inpatient in three different mental health hospitals, including Egypt, Kuwaiti Center of Psychiatric Health and the Centre for Addiction and Mental Health (CAMH) in Toronto, Ontario. Elbahmasawy was ‘vulnerable’ and minor with no history of violence or criminal record when was encouraged by an undercover FBI informant to do violence. El Bahnasawy was entrapped by the FBI with the help of RCMP knowingly of his mental illness but no officials had ever contacted the family. El Bahnasawy was convicted for his role in an online chatting terror plot while he was a teenager but none of the attacks were carried out.

Terror plot and arrest 
Abdulrahman El Bahnasawy was a 17-year-old living at his parents' home in Mississauga, west of Toronto, in 2015 when he met an undercover FBI agent online. El Bahnasawy agreed to help plot attacks in New York City, including the bombing of Times Square and the city's subway system.
Abdulrahman was unmedicated at this time and waiting his turn in the mental health hospital.
The undercover agent exchanged “inflammatory messages” with the mentally ill Canadian, Abdulrahman El Bahnasawy as communications showed the Canadian was influenced by the informant who contributed to Mr. El Bahnasawy's radicalization,” the defence lawyers said.

El Bahnasawy began communicating on message boards in support of the Islamic State of Iraq and al-Sham (ISIS), a designated foreign terrorist organization. He conspired with Talha Haroon, a 20-year-old U.S. citizen residing in Pakistan, and Russell Salic, a 38-year-old Philippines citizen and resident, to conduct bombings and shootings in heavily populated areas of New York City during the Islamic holy month of Ramadhan in 2016, all in the name of ISIS. El Bahnasawy purchased bomb-making materials for the attack and rented out a cabin that was driving distance from New York City to build the bombs for the attack.All activates were online with the encouragement and guidance from the undercover as his lawyer stated in court filing. Haroon allegedly made plans to travel from Pakistan to New York City to join El Bahnasawy in carrying out the attacks. As El Bahnasawy and Haroon prepared to execute the attacks, Salic allegedly wired money from the Philippines to the United States to help fund the terrorist operation.

El Bahnasawy's Canadian lawyer, Dennis Edney, alleges the FBI entrapped his client and that the RCMP illegally obtained El Bahnasawy's medical records and provided them to the Americans so they could profile their target.
The group was infiltrated by an undercover informant for the Federal Bureau of Investigation (FBI), who acted as if they were willing to participate in the attack. On a family trip in May 2016, El Bahnasawy was arrested by federal agents in New Jersey; he was charged with conspiracy to commit terror acts transcending national borders and providing material support to terror groups. Haroon and Salic were arrested in Pakistan and the Philippines, respectively. In 2020, a Pakistani Supreme Court decided to halt the United States extradition request of Haroon. Salic, a Philippian doctor is also yet to be extradited to the United States.

On December 19, 2018, El Bahnasawy was sentenced to 40 years in federal prison. The prosecution on the case had pushed for El Bahnasawy to be sentenced to life imprisonment. El Bahnasawy's mother yelled "This is a sick boy! This is crazy. You have no justice," before being ushered out of the courtroom.

Court Recommendations 
The Court makes the following recommendations to the Bureau of Prisons: The Court recommends that the defendant be designated to FCI Butner-Medium (care level 3) to facilitate greater proximity to mental health services. To the extent BOP finds that the defendant should be housed at a Mental Health Care Level 2 facility, the Court recommends FCI McKean-Medium or FCI Schuylkill-Medium, both in Pennsylvania, to facilitate regular visitation with his parents and sister.Despite the court recommendations, El Bahnasawy has been transferred to numerous prisons and ended up at the ADX facility.

Incarceration and prison attack 
After El Bahnasawy's conviction in late 2018, he spent 2019 and much of 2020 in the Special Housing Units of Federal Correctional Institution, Gilmer and United States Penitentiary, Big Sandy. In late 2020, El Bahnasawy was transferred from Big Sandy to United States Penitentiary, Allenwood. 
Professionals who evaluated El Bahnasawy in the New York City prosecution concluded his mental issues included bipolar and other disorders along with auditory hallucinations, His attorney Andrew J. Frisch pointed out. The latter are in the form of an imagined person who threatens him if he fails to follow directions, he said. Despite the mental illness history, A physician assistant's notes of a Nov. 25, 2020, psychiatric evaluation at Allenwood stated El Bahnasawy was not medicated, as mentioned in the court documents.

On December 7, 2020, at around 6:15 am, El Bahnasawy snuck behind USP Allenwood corrections officer Dale Franquet Jr and stabbed him twice in the back and eye with a 14-inch shank. Franquet lost his eye in the attack. the assault occurred in the transitional care unit at Allenwood to which inmates with mental illness are designated by the Bureau of Prisons (BOP). El Bahnasawy was quickly transferred to United States Penitentiary, Lewisburg. In April 2021, El Bahnasawy was transferred to the United States Penitentiary, Administrative Maximum Facility.

On October 20, 2022, El Bahnasawy plead no contest to charges of two counts of assault on a federal officer. In addition he was also charged with two counts of assault with intent to commit murder, assault with a deadly weapon, possession of a prohibited object, and providing material support or resources to a foreign terrorist organization. According to his attorney, Andrew J. Frisch, El Bahnasawy faces an additional 40 years in prison for the counts in which he wants to enter pleas on. It is undisputable El Bahnasawy suffers from mental illness and wasn't properly medicated , his attorney states in the court filing.

References 

Islamic terrorism in the United States
People convicted on terrorism charges
Terrorist incidents in 2016
Failed terrorist attempts in the United States
Inmates of ADX Florence
Living people
Year of birth missing (living people)
Canadian people imprisoned abroad